The Hyundai Gamma engine was introduced in 2006 to replace the existing Hyundai Alpha engine. There are 1.4 L and 1.6 L versions of this engine.

The Gamma II can apparently run in Atkinson cycle (leaving intake open longer for more complete burn but less displacement) under low loads for additional fuel economy with the ability to shift to Otto cycle on demand due to high loads or extra acceleration.

Gamma I

1.4 MPi (G4FA) 
The G4FA is a  engine. The engine features double overhead cams with 4 valves per cylinder and a chain driven camshaft with continuously variable valve timing system CVVT on intake camshaft only. It is replaced by the 1.4 L Kappa (G4LC) engine.

Applications

Hyundai Accent/Verna/Solaris (RB/RC) (2011–2017)
Hyundai i20 (PB) (2008–2014)
Hyundai ix20 (JC) (2010–2019)
Kia Cee'd (ED) (2006–2012)
Kia Cee'd (JD) (2012–2018)
Kia Rio/K2 (QB) (2011–2017)
Kia Venga (YN) (2009–2019)

1.6 MPi (G4FC) 
In 2010, the G4FC was replaced by the G4FG engine.

Applications

Hyundai Accent/Verna/Solaris (RB/RC) (2011–2017)
Hyundai Celesta (ID) (2017–present)
Hyundai Elantra (2006–2020)
Hyundai Veloster (FS) (2011–2018)
Hyundai i20 (PB) (2008–2011)
Hyundai i30 (FD) (2007–2012)
Hyundai ix20 (OJ) (2010–2019)
Kia Rio/K2 (QB) (2011–2017)
Kia Cee'd (ED) (2006–2012)
Kia Forte/Cerato (TD) (2008–2012)
Kia KX3 (KC) (2015–2019)
Kia Soul (AM) (2008–2011)
Kia Venga (YN) (2009–2019)

1.6 FLEX (F4FA/F4FC) 
Flex fuel version of the Gamma 1.6 MPi.

Applications

Hyundai HB20 (HB) (2012–2019)
Hyundai HB20 (BR2) (2019–present)
Hyundai i30 (GD) (2011–2016)

1.6 LPI (L4FA/L4FC) 
It is a hybrid variant with liquefied petroleum gas engine and electric motor.

Applications

Hyundai Avante (2010–present)
Hyundai Avante LPI hybrid (2009–2013)
Kia Forte (2009–2013)

Gamma II

1.6 MPi (G4FG) 

Applications

Hyundai Accent/Verna (RB/RC) (2011–2017)
Hyundai Accent/Verna/Solaris (HC/YC) (2017–present)
Hyundai Creta/ix25 (GS/GC) (2014–2020)
Hyundai Creta (SU2r) (2021–present)
Hyundai Elantra (MD/UD) (2010–2015)
Hyundai Elantra (AD) (2015–2020)
Hyundai Elantra (CN7) (2020–present)
Hyundai HB20 (HB) (2012–2019)
Hyundai HB20 (BR2) (2019–present)
Hyundai i30 (GD) (2011–2017)
Hyundai i30 (PD) (2016–present)
Hyundai Venue (QX) (2019–present)
Kia Cee'd (JD) (2012–2018)
Kia Ceed (CD) (2018–present)
Kia Cerato (BD) (2018–present)
Kia Forte/Cerato (YD) (2012–2018)
Kia KX3 (KC) (2015–2019)
Kia Rio (YB) (2017–present)
Kia Rio/K2 (FB) (2017–present)
Kia Seltos (SP2/SP2i) (2019–present)
Kia Soul (AM) (2011–2014)
Kia Soul (PS) (2013–2019)
Kia Soul (SK3) (2019–present)

1.6 FLEX (F4FG) 
Flex fuel version of the Gamma II 1.6 MPi.

Applications

Hyundai Creta (GS) (2017–2021)

1.6 GDi (G4FD) 
The 1.6 Gamma GDi engine is a gasoline direct injection engine, with Dual-Continuous Variable Valve Timing (D-CVVT).

Applications

Hyundai Accent (HC) (2017–present)
Hyundai Elantra (MD) (2010–2015)
Hyundai i30 (GD) (2011–2016)
Hyundai i40 (2011–2019)
Hyundai Tucson (LM) (2009–2015)
Hyundai Tucson (TL) (2015–2020)
Hyundai Veloster (FS) (2011–2018)
Kia Carens (RP) (2013–2019)
Kia Cee'd (JD) (2012–2018)
Kia K3/Forte (YD) (2012–2018)
Kia Rio (UB) (2012–2016)
Kia Rio (YB) (2017–2019, detuned 130hp)
Kia Soul (AM) (2012-2014)
Kia Soul (PS) (2013-2019 Base Model)
Kia Sportage (SL) (2010–2015)
Kia Sportage (QL) (2015–2021)

1.6 T-GDI (G4FJ)

Announced in 2011, it is a version of 1.6 Gamma GDi with twin-scroll turbocharger, air guided intercooler, direct fuel injection system and dual CVVT.

The engine was unveiled in the 11th Hyundai-Kia International Powertrain Conference.

The engine has been revised in the 2nd Generation Veloster Turbo to include a new pressurized cooling system, higher compression ratio of 10:1, electronically actuated wastegate, and a new ECU (CPEGD2.20.3).

Its improved version equipped with Continuously Variable Valve Duration (CVVD) was released in 2019 as the Smartstream G1.6T (G4FP) engine.

Applications

Hyundai Accent/Verna (RB/RC) (2011–2017)
Hyundai Elantra (AD) (2017–2020)
Hyundai i30 (GD) (2015–2016)
Hyundai i30 (PD) (2016–present)
Hyundai Kona (OS) (2017–2020, detuned)
Hyundai Lafesta (2018–present)
Hyundai Mistra (CF) (2017–2020)
Hyundai Sonata (LF) (2014–2019, detuned)
Hyundai Tucson (TL) (2015-2020, detuned)
Hyundai Veloster (FS) (2012–2018)
Hyundai Veloster (JS) (2018–2020)
Kia Cee'd (JD) (2012–2018)
Kia Ceed (CD) (2018–present)
Kia Forte/K3 (2012–present)
Kia K4 (2014–2021)
Kia KX3 (KC) (2015–2019)
Kia Optima/K5 (JF) (2015–2019)
Kia Seltos (SP2) (2019–2022, detuned)
Kia Soul (SK3) (2019–present)
Kia Sportage (QL) (2015–2021)

Engines

See also

 List of Hyundai engines

References

Gamma
Straight-four engines
Gasoline engines by model